The 1953 Giro d'Italia was the 36th edition of the Giro d'Italia. The Giro started off in Milan on 12 May with a  flat stage and concluded back in Milan with a  relatively flat mass-start stage on 2 June. Sixteen teams entered the race, which was won by Italian Fausto Coppi of the Bianchi team. Second and third respectively were Swiss rider Hugo Koblet and Italian Pasquale Fornara.

Hugo Koblet held the pink jersey up until the penultimate stage, when Coppi attacked and left him behind on the climb up the Stelvio Pass (included in the Giro for the first time), taking the lead and securing the final victory. Since then the Stelvio Pas is par excellence the Cima Coppi of the competition.

Teams

Sixteen teams were invited by the race organizers to participate in the 1953 edition of the Giro d'Italia. Like the Tour de France the teams were nation based for the first time at the Giro, with each national team being sponsored by an Italian brand. Each team sent a squad of seven riders, which meant that the race started with a peloton of 112 cyclists. From the riders that began the race, 72 made it to the finish in Milan. In total there were 35 foreign riders that started the race. 

The teams entering the race were:

  
  
  
Bianchi
 
 
Francia
 
Ganna
 
 
Legnano
Levirere

Pre-race favorites

The "Big Three" of Gino Bartali (Bartali), Fausto Coppi (Bianchi), and Fiorenzo Magni (Ganna) were expected to dominate the general classification. A La Liberté writer felt that young riders Giancarlo Astrua (Atala), Nino Defilippis (Legnano), Pasquale Fornara (Bottecchia), and climber Bruno Monti (Arbos) would be exciting to watch throughout the race to see their potential. French rider and Swiss riders were thought to be very strong, while Spanish riders Bernardo Ruiz and Michel Gual were thought to be their country's best riders. Swiss rider and former Giro winner Hugo Koblet (Cilo) was regarded as being in sensational form entering the Giro, coming off a win at the Tour de Romandie. Taking that into account with his good health, the media felt Koblet could be the one to challenge Coppi best. 

A notable absence from the race was Bianchi rider Loretto Petrucci who had won the previous two Milan–San Remo, who was not brought to the race because of his young age according to his team; however, he had previously raced in 1951 and 1952. A La Sentinelle writer believed that Petrucci's omission from the race was due to Petrucci's desire to race for victories and not for the team leader Coppi.

Route and stages

On 26 March, the route was announced to be from 12 May to 28 May. It was later rumored on 30 March, that the race may include the Olympic stadium. The full route was later unveiled on 9 April 1953, with a changed finale on the 2 June. The race route featured 20 days of racing spread across 22 days as 20 May in Pisa and 27 May in San Pellegrino were set aside as rest days.

Race overview

The race started outside the Piazza del Duomo in Milan. Ferdinand Kubler withdrew from the race early on due to disputes.

Classification leadership

The leader of the general classification – calculated by adding the stage finish times of each rider – wore a pink jersey. This classification is the most important of the race, and its winner is considered as the winner of the Giro. Time bonuses were awarded to the stage winner and the first riders to summit categorized climbs. Riders were allowed to have teammates and team cars help to following accidents and punctures. "Strollers" in years past were punished with small fines, but in this edition of the race they were punished by time adjustments and repeat offenses may lead to disqualification from the race. The winner of the race received 1 million lire, while the remainder of the podium received 450,000 lire each.

Two additional jerseys were in use. The green jersey was given to the best foreign cyclist in the general classification; at the end of the Giro it was worn by Swiss Hugo Koblet. The white jersey was given to the best cyclist riding with a licence for independents; this was won by Angelo Conterno. The winner of each classification earned 500,000 lire.

The mountains classification leader was not identified by a special jersey. The climbs all awarded three points to the first rider and one point to the second rider to cross the summit. There was one category for mountains which awarded five points down to one point for the first riders to cross the summit. The winner of the mountains classification was given 400,000 lire. Although no jersey was awarded, there was also one classification for the teams, in which the stage finish times of the best three cyclists per team were added; the leading team was the one with the lowest total time. The team winning team received 2.5 million lire.

Each day leading the general classification earned the rider and his team 100,000 lira, while the independent rider and foreign rider earned 25,000 lira each day for leading their respective classifications.

Final standings

General classification

Independent rider classification

Foreign rider classification

Mountains classification

Team classification

References

Citations

1953
1953 in Italian sport
1953 in road cycling
May 1953 sports events in Europe
June 1953 sports events in Europe
1953 Challenge Desgrange-Colombo